Lee Seung-il (born December 21, 1982) is a South Korean field hockey player. At the 2012 Summer Olympics, he competed for the national team in the men's tournament.

References

External links

Living people
South Korean male field hockey players
Field hockey players at the 2012 Summer Olympics
Olympic field hockey players of South Korea
1982 births
Asian Games medalists in field hockey
Field hockey players at the 2006 Asian Games
Field hockey players at the 2010 Asian Games
Field hockey players at the 2014 Asian Games
Asian Games gold medalists for South Korea
Asian Games bronze medalists for South Korea
Medalists at the 2006 Asian Games
Medalists at the 2014 Asian Games
2006 Men's Hockey World Cup players
2010 Men's Hockey World Cup players
2014 Men's Hockey World Cup players